is a town located in Kasuya District, Fukuoka Prefecture, Japan.

As of 2016, the town had an estimated population of 27,459 and a density of 1,700 persons per km². The total area is 16.33 km².

See also
Sue Station (Fukuoka)
Shinbaru Station

References

External links

Sue official website 

Towns in Fukuoka Prefecture